Mniotype is a genus of moths of the family Noctuidae.

Species
 Mniotype adusta – Dark Brocade (Esper, 1790) (syn: Mniotype sommeri (Lefebvre, 1836))
 Mniotype albostigmata (Bethune-Baker, 1891)
 Mniotype anilis (Boisduval, 1840)
 Mniotype aphanes (Boursin, 1980)
 Mniotype aulombardi Plante, 1994
 Mniotype bathensis (Lutzau, 1905)
 Mniotype cbgurungi Hreblay & Ronkay, 1998
 Mniotype chlorobesa Hreblay, Peregovits & Ronkay, 1999
 Mniotype clavata Hreblay & Ronkay, 1999
 Mniotype compitalis (Draudt, 1909)
 Mniotype concinna (Leech, 1900)
 Mniotype csanadii Hreblay & Ronkay, 1999
 Mniotype cyanochlora Hreblay & Ronkay, 1998
 Mniotype deluccai (Berio, 1976)
 Mniotype ducta (Grote, 1878) (syn: Mniotype versuta (Smith, 1895))
 Mniotype falcifera Hreblay & Ronkay, 1999
 Mniotype fratellum (Pinker, 1965)
 Mniotype hackeri de Freina & Behounek, 1996
 Mniotype inthanoni Hreblay & Ronkay, 1999
 Mniotype johanna (Staudinger, 1897)
 Mniotype krisztina Hreblay & Ronkay, 1998
 Mniotype lama (Staudinger, 1900)
 Mniotype leucocyma (Hampson, 1907)
 Mniotype lugens Ronkay & Varga, 1990
 Mniotype melanodonta (Hampson, 1906)
 Mniotype mucronata (Moore, 1882)
 Mniotype olivascens (Draudt, 1950)
 Mniotype pallescens McDunnough, 1946
 Mniotype satura – Beautiful Arches (Denis & Schiffermüller, 1775)
 Mniotype schumacheri (Rebel, 1917)
 Mniotype solieri (Boisduval, 1829)
 Mniotype spinosa (Chrétien, 1911)
 Mniotype tenera (Smith, 1900) (syn: Mniotype ferida (Smith, 1908), Mniotype miniota (Smith, 1908))
 Mniotype usurpatrix (Rebel, 1914)

References
 Mniotype at funet.fi
  Retrieved April 21, 2018.

Cuculliinae
Moth genera